The Kincardine Bridge is a road bridge crossing the Firth of Forth from Falkirk council area to Kincardine, Fife, Scotland.

History

The bridge was constructed between 1932 and 1936, to a design by Sir Alexander Gibb & Partners, Consulting Engineers, and Architect, Donald Watson. It was the first road crossing of the River Forth downstream of Stirling, completed nearly thirty years before the Forth Road Bridge, which stands  to the south-east.

The bridge was constructed with a swinging central section which remained in use until 1988, that would allow larger ships to sail upstream to the small port at Alloa.

The bridge is part of the A985 road (formerly A876), and carries a single lane in each direction. Until the opening of the Clackmannanshire Bridge in 2008, it was the customary diversion route for traffic north from Edinburgh and eastern Scotland when the Forth Road Bridge was closed or under repair. As a result of the additional traffic using the bridge at these times, joining the high volume of regular commuter traffic, the town of Kincardine was frequently congested.

Second bridge
The original bridge, at over 70 years old, was identified by the Scottish Executive as being in need of replacement. The new Clackmannanshire Bridge was opened on 19 November 2008.
The original bridge was given Category A listed status by Historic Scotland in 2005, and was closed temporarily for upgrading works in 2011.

With the opening of the new bridge, the Kincardine Bridge was re-numbered as part of the A985 while the new Clackmannanshire Bridge became part of the re-routed A876, forming the Kincardine bypass.

See also
275 kV Forth Crossing
M876 motorway

References

External links

Scottish Roads Archive - The Kincardine Bridge
Kincardine Local History Group – Wonders of World Engineering Article detailing the construction of Kincardine Bridge
Gazetteer for Scotland
– video clip of what the new road and crossing will be like

Bridges completed in 1936
Category A listed buildings in Falkirk (council area)
Swing bridges in Scotland
Listed bridges in Scotland
Road bridges in Scotland
Bridges in Fife
Category A listed buildings in Fife
Bridges in Falkirk (council area)
1936 establishments in Scotland